The 2001 Spanish Grand Prix (formally the XLIII Gran Premio Marlboro de Espana) was a Formula One motor race held on 29 April 2001 at the Circuit de Catalunya, Montmeló, Spain. It was the fifth round of the 2001 Formula One season. The 65-lap race was won by Michael Schumacher driving a Ferrari car after starting from pole position. Juan Pablo Montoya finished second driving a Williams car with Jacques Villeneuve third for the BAR team.

The race was Schumacher's third win of the season, and the result that he led the Drivers' Championship, eight points ahead of Coulthard and twenty-two ahead of Rubens Barrichello. Ferrari extended their lead in the Constructors' Championship, eighteen points ahead of McLaren, and thirty-two ahead of Williams, with 12 races of the season remaining.

This race marked the return of electronic driver aids, which were made legal and reintroduced by the FIA at this race, and this event marked the first time since the 1993 Australian Grand Prix in which the use of traction control, launch control, and fully-automatic gearboxes were all permitted. Formula One cars would not race without these systems again until the 2004 and 2008 Australian Grand Prix, respectively.

Background
The Grand Prix was contested by 22 drivers, in eleven teams of two. The teams, also known as constructors, were Ferrari, McLaren, Williams, Benetton, BAR, Jordan, Arrows, Sauber, Jaguar, Minardi and Prost.

Before the race, Ferrari driver Michael Schumacher and McLaren driver David Coulthard were tied for the lead of the Drivers' Championship with 26 points each. Behind them in the Drivers' Championship, Rubens Barrichello was third on 14 points in the other Ferrari, with Ralf Schumacher and Nick Heidfeld on 12 and 7 points respectively. In the Constructors' Championship, Ferrari were leading on 40 points and McLaren were second on 30 points, with Williams third on 12 points.

Following the San Marino Grand Prix on April 15, several teams conducted testing sessions at the Silverstone circuit from April 17–19. Heinz-Harald Frentzen (Jordan) set the fastest time on the first day, while Mika Häkkinen (McLaren) topped the second and final day's running. Sauber, Ferrari, and Minardi opted to test at the Fiorano circuit from April 18–20. Luca Badoer topped the first day's running, while Michael Schumacher was fastest on the second and final days of testing. During the testing sessions and race, several teams tested out traction control, fully-automatic gearboxes, and launch control, all of which were being re-introduced.

There were two driver changes heading into the race. Having been in one of the two Jaguar cars since the start of the season, Luciano Burti was released from the team and replaced by Pedro de la Rosa. The second driver change was Burti moving to the Prost team replacing Gastón Mazzacane. Prost attempted to replace Mazzacane with Jordan test driver Ricardo Zonta, among others.

Practice

Four practice sessions were held before the Sunday race—two on Friday, and two on Saturday. The Friday morning and afternoon sessions each lasted an hour. The third and final practice sessions were held on Saturday morning and lasted 45 minutes. The first Friday session was held in dry and sunny conditions, becoming cloudier during the day. Coulthard was fastest in the first session, with a time of 1:20.107 that was half a second faster than Barrichello. Michael Schumacher, Ralf Schumacher, Häkkinen and Olivier Panis rounded out the top six. In the second practice session, Coulthard, was quickest with a time of 1:20.107, ahead of Eddie Irvine, Barrichello, Panis, Michael Schumacher and Häkkinen, who were within a second of Coulthard's time. The Saturday morning sessions were again held in dry and sunny conditions. Michael Schumacher was quickest in the third practice session with a time of 1:18.634; Häkkinen was second fastest despite going off into the gravel late in the session. Coulthard, Barrichello, Jarno Trulli and Frentzen rounded off the top six. Michael Schumacher again set the fastest time in the fourth practice session, with a time identical to his fastest in the third practice session that was less than five thousands of a second faster than Barrichello. Coulthard was just off both Ferrari drivers pace. The Sauber drivers were running quicker—Kimi Räikkönen in fourth and Heidfeld in fifth—with Trulli completing the top six in his Jordan.

Qualifying
Saturday's afternoon qualifying session lasted for an hour. During this session, the 107% rule was in effect, which necessitated each driver set a time within 107% of the quickest lap to qualify for the race. Each driver was limited to twelve laps. Michael Schumacher clinched his fourth pole position of the season with a time of 1:18.201. He was joined on the front row by Häkkinen who was less than one-tenth of a second behind. Coulthard qualified third, though he struggled with the balance on his car, he was confident on beginning the race on the racing line. Barrichello qualified fourth, half a second behind Michael Schumacher, having battled both McLaren drivers for time during the late stages of qualifying. Ralf Schumacher qualified fifth. Trulli, Jacques Villeneuve, Frentzen, Räikkönen and Heidfeld rounded out the top ten.

Qualifying classification

Warm-up
The drivers took to the track at 09:30 (GMT +1) for a 30-minute warm-up session. Both Ferrari cars maintained their good pace from qualifying; Michael Schumacher had the fastest time of 1:20.680. Barrichello was fourth in the other Ferrari car; Häkkinen and Coulthard split them for second and third positions respectively, despite the latter's car suffering from an engine failure. Frentzen and Panis rounded out the top six with identical lap times.

Race

The conditions were dry and overcast for the race with the air temperature  and the track temperature . The race started at 14:00 local time. Coulthard stalled his car at the start of the parade lap, forcing him to start at the back of the grid. Michael Schumacher made a good start, retaining his first position; Häkkinen behind him maintained his second position. Frentzen, from eighth, made a poor start losing fourteen places. Coulthard sustained damage to his front wing in a minor collision, resulting in a pitstop. At the completion of the first lap, Michael Schumacher led from Häkkinen, Barrichello, Ralf Schumacher, Trulli, Montoya, Villeneuve, Heidfeld, Eddie Irvine, Räikkönen, Panis, Jos Verstappen, Jean Alesi, Burti, Fisichella, Fernando Alonso, Pedro de la Rosa, Frentzen, Jenson Button, Tarso Marques, Enrique Bernoldi and Coulthard.

Michael Schumacher and Häkkinen gradually began to pull away from Barrichello. On lap 3, Panis overtook Räikkönen for 10th position and Alonso dropped to 16th position having been overtaken by de la Rosa and Frentzen. As the race progressed, Michael Schumacher began to open a small lead over Häkkinen. On lap 6, Frentzen attempted to overtake de la Rosa around turn 10 for 16th position, with both retiring from the race, as a result of a collision between both drivers.

In the closing laps, Häkkinen increased his lead over Michael Schumacher to over 40 seconds, and it appeared that the McLaren driver would win the race comfortably. However, as Häkkinen started the final lap, his engine failed without warning, and was forced to coast around the circuit before pulling off at turn seven. Montoya likewise claimed the first Formula One podium of his career, with second position. Villeneuve took the final place on the podium. Trulli managed to fend off Coulthard for fourth position, with Heidfeld completing the points scoring positions in sixth. Panis and Räikkönen finished seventh and eighth respectively. Despite not finishing the race, Häkkinen was classified ninth. The lapped cars of Alesi, Burti, Verstappen, Alonso, Fisichella, Button and Marques were the last of the finishing drivers.

Post-race
The top three drivers appeared on the podium and in the subsequent press conference. Although Michael Schumacher was pleased with his race performance, he expressed sympathy over Häkkinen's retirement. After the race he said, "I simply said sorry and I wanted to apologise. It belongs to him to be sitting here, he hasn't made any mistakes and sometimes racing is hard but to some degree that's the way racing is. It's a shame for him it happened so short before the end, if it happens sometimes 20 laps in the race it's less hard to take but this way must be very shocking for him".

McLaren team principal Ron Dennis said Coulthard's stall on the parade lap was caused by a computer glitch. He also stated that Coulthard was not to blame for the incident, despite initial criticism of the Scot, due to a lack of information regarding the problem. Dennis also revealed the cause of Hakkinen's engine failure which was down to an hydraulic leak, leading to the clutch failing to operate.

The race result left Michael Schumacher leading the Drivers' Championship with 36 points. Coulthard was second on 28 points, fourteen points ahead of Barrichello and sixteen ahead of Ralf Schumacher. In the Constructors' Championship, Ferrari extended their lead with 50 points, McLaren maintained second with 32 points, with Williams maintaining third with 18 points, with 12 races of the season remaining.

Race classification
Drivers who scored championship points are denoted in bold.

Championship standings after the race

Drivers' Championship standings

Constructors' Championship standings

 Note: Only the top five positions are included for both sets of standings.

References

Spanish Grand Prix
Spanish Grand Prix
Grand Prix
April 2001 sports events in Europe